The 2016 United States Senate election in California was held on November 8, 2016, to elect a member of the United States Senate to represent the State of California, concurrently with the 2016 U.S. presidential election, as well as elections to the United States Senate in other states and elections to the United States House of Representatives and various state and local elections.

Under California's nonpartisan blanket primary law, all candidates appear on the same ballot, regardless of party. In the primary, voters may vote for any candidate, regardless of their party affiliation. In the California system, the top two finishers—regardless of party—advance to the general election in November, even if a candidate receives a majority of the vote in the primary election. Washington and Louisiana have similar "jungle primary" style processes for senators.

Incumbent Democratic Senator Barbara Boxer decided to not run for reelection to a fifth term. This was the first open seat Senate election in California since 1992, when Boxer was first elected. In the primary on June 7, 2016, California Attorney General Kamala Harris and U.S. Representative Loretta Sanchez, both Democrats, finished in first and second place, respectively, and contested the general election. For the first time since direct elections to the Senate began after the passage of the Seventeenth Amendment in 1913, no Republican appeared on the general election ballot for U.S. Senate in California. The highest Republican finisher in the primary won only 7.8 percent of the vote, and the 10 Republicans only won 27.9 percent of the vote among them.

In the general election, Harris defeated Sanchez in a landslide, carrying 54 of the state's 58 counties, including Sanchez's home county of Orange, although Sanchez held Harris to a margin of less than 1% in the Central Valley counties of Kern and Merced.

Background 
Barbara Boxer was reelected with 52.1% of the vote in 2010 against Republican Carly Fiorina. Toward the end of 2014, Boxer's low fundraising and cash-on-hand numbers led to speculation that she would retire. On January 8, 2015, she announced that she would not run for reelection.

Candidates

Democratic Party

Declared 
 Cristina Grappo
 Kamala Harris, Attorney General of California
 Massie Munroe, engineer
 Herbert G. Peters
 Emory Rodgers, activist
 Loretta Sanchez, U.S. Representative
 Steve Stokes, small business owner and independent candidate for CA-28 in 2014

Withdrew 
 Stewart Albertson, attorney

Declined 
 Xavier Becerra, U.S. Representative and candidate for Mayor of Los Angeles in 2001
 Ami Bera, U.S. Representative
 Barbara Boxer, incumbent U.S. Senator
 Julia Brownley, U.S. Representative
 Louis Caldera, former director of the White House Military Office, former United States Secretary of the Army and former state assemblyman
 Tony Cárdenas, U.S. Representative
 John Chiang, California State Treasurer, former California State Controller and former member of the State Board of Equalization
 Kevin de León, President pro tempore of the California State Senate
 John Garamendi, U.S. Representative, former Lieutenant Governor of California, former California Insurance Commissioner and former Deputy Secretary of the Interior
 Eric Garcetti, Mayor of Los Angeles
 Jane Harman, director, president and CEO of the Woodrow Wilson International Center for Scholars, former U.S. Representative and candidate for the governorship in 1998
 Jared Huffman, U.S. Representative
 Kevin Johnson, Mayor of Sacramento and former professional basketball player
 Sam Liccardo, Mayor of San Jose
 Bill Lockyer, former California State Treasurer and former Attorney General of California
 Gloria Molina, former Los Angeles County Supervisor
 Janet Napolitano, president of the University of California, former United States Secretary of Homeland Security and former Governor of Arizona
 Gavin Newsom, Lieutenant Governor of California and former Mayor of San Francisco (running for the governorship in 2018)
 Alex Padilla, Secretary of State of California and former state senator
 Raul Ruiz, U.S. Representative
 Linda Sánchez, U.S. Representative
 Sheryl Sandberg, COO of Facebook
 Adam Schiff, U.S. Representative
 Hilda Solis, Los Angeles County Supervisor, former United States Secretary of Labor and former U.S. Representative
 Jackie Speier, U.S. Representative and candidate for the lieutenant governorship in 2006
 Darrell Steinberg, former President pro tempore of the California State Senate
 Tom Steyer, hedge fund manager, philanthropist and environmentalist
 Eric Swalwell, U.S. Representative
 Mark Takano, U.S. Representative
 Ellen Tauscher, former Under Secretary of State for Arms Control and International Security Affairs and former U.S. Representative
 Antonio Villaraigosa, former Mayor of Los Angeles
 Steve Westly, former California State Controller and candidate for the governorship in 2006 (running for the governorship in 2018)

Endorsements

Republican Party

Declared 
 Greg Conlon, businessman
 Tom Del Beccaro, former chairman of the California Republican Party
 Von Hougo, educator
 Don Krampe, retiree and candidate for the U.S. Senate in 2012
 Jerry J. Laws
 Tom Palzer, former city planner
 Karen Roseberry, educator
 George "Duf" Sundheim, former chairman of the California Republican Party
 Ron Unz, activist and candidate for governor in 1994
 Jarrell Williamson, attorney
 Phil Wyman, former state senator, former state assemblyman, candidate for CA-25 in 1992 and candidate for Attorney General in 2014
 George C. Yang, businessman

Withdrew 
 Rocky Chávez, state assemblyman (running for re-election)

Declined 
 Mary Bono, former U.S. Representative
 Tom Campbell, former U.S. Representative, nominee for the U.S. Senate in 2000 and candidate for the U.S. Senate in 1992 and 2010
 Carl DeMaio, former San Diego City Council member, candidate for Mayor of San Diego in 2012 and candidate for California's 52nd congressional district in 2014
 Tim Donnelly, former state assemblyman, Minuteman founder and candidate for governor in 2014 (running for CA-08)
 David Dreier, former U.S. Representative
 Larry Elder, talk radio host and attorney
 Kevin Faulconer, Mayor of San Diego
 Carly Fiorina, businesswoman and nominee for the U.S. Senate in 2010 (running for President)
 Darrell Issa, U.S. Representative and candidate for the U.S. Senate in 1998
 Ernie Konnyu, former U.S. Representative and former state assemblyman
 Abel Maldonado, former lieutenant governor of California, candidate for California State Controller in 2006, for CA-24 in 2012 and for governor in 2014
 Kevin McCarthy, U.S. Representative and House Majority Leader
 Doug Ose, former U.S. Representative
 Pete Peterson, executive director of the Davenport Institute for Public Engagement at Pepperdine University and candidate for Secretary of State of California in 2014
 Steve Poizner, former California Insurance Commissioner and candidate for governor in 2010
 Condoleezza Rice, former United States Secretary of State, former United States National Security Advisor and former provost of Stanford University
 Ed Royce, U.S. Representative
 Arnold Schwarzenegger, actor and former governor of California
 Ashley Swearengin, Mayor of Fresno and candidate for California State Controller in 2014
 Meg Whitman, president and CEO of Hewlett-Packard and nominee for governor in 2010

Endorsements

Green Party

Declared 
 Pamela Elizondo

Libertarian Party

Declared 
 Mark Matthew Herd, community organizer
 Gail Lightfoot, retired nurse and perennial candidate

Peace and Freedom Party

Declared 
 John Thompson Parker

Independent

Declared 
 Mikelis Beitiks, climate change activist
 Eleanor Garcia, factory worker
 Tim Gildersleeve
 Clive Grey
 Don Grundmann, chiropractor, chairman of the Constitution Party of California, and perennial candidate (also sought the Constitution Party nomination for President of the United States)
 Jason Hanania, attorney and engineer
 Jason Kraus
 Paul Merritt
 Gar Myers
 Ling Ling Shi, author
 Scott A. Vineberg

Declined 
 Angelina Jolie, actress, filmmaker and former Goodwill Ambassador for the United Nations High Commissioner for Refugees

Primary election

Fundraising 
The following are Federal Election Commission disclosures through the reporting period ending March 31, 2016.

Polling

Results

General election

Fundraising 
The following are Federal Election Commission disclosures through the reporting period ending March 31, 2016.

Debates

Predictions

Polling

Results

Miscellaneous 
Harris stepped down from her Senate seat on January 18, 2021, two days before her inauguration as Vice President. This makes Harris the first US Senator elected to a full six-year term since Barack Obama in 2008 to not finish what would be her sole term.  On December 22, 2020, California Governor Gavin Newsom appointed California Secretary of State Alex Padilla to serve the remainder of Harris' term. Although Harris no longer occupies this Senate seat, she became President of the Senate on January 20, 2021, by virtue of her election as vice president.

Harris is the second incumbent US Senator from this seat to be elected vice president, the first being Richard Nixon in 1952.

See also 
 United States Senate elections, 2016

References

External links 
Official campaign websites
 Kamala Harris (D) for Senate
 Loretta Sanchez (D) for Senate

2016
California
2016 California elections
Kamala Harris